Helio Castro (born 20 October 1917) is a Salvadoran former sports shooter. He competed in two events at the 1968 Summer Olympics.

References

External links

1917 births
Possibly living people
Salvadoran male sport shooters
Olympic shooters of El Salvador
Shooters at the 1968 Summer Olympics
People from La Paz Department (El Salvador)